Two ships of the Royal Navy have borne the name HMS Pictou, named for Pictou, Nova Scotia:

  was a 14-gun privateer or letter of marque that the Royal Navy captured in 1813. The  captured and burnt her off Barbados in February 1814.
  was a 14-gun schooner, previously the American privateer Zebra, which  captured on 20 April 1813. The Royal Navy purchased her in 1814 and sold her in 1818.

See also

References

Royal Navy ship names